Henri Léon Victor Susse (23 September 1844 – 16 April 1910) was a French sailor who competed in the 1900 Summer Olympics. He was the helmsman of the French boat Favorite 1, which won two silver medals in the races of the 2 to 3 ton class. He also participated in the Open class, but did not finish the race.

Further reading

References

External links

French male sailors (sport)
Sailors at the 1900 Summer Olympics – 2 to 3 ton
Sailors at the 1900 Summer Olympics – Open class
Olympic sailors of France
1844 births
1910 deaths
Olympic silver medalists for France
Olympic medalists in sailing
Medalists at the 1900 Summer Olympics
Sportspeople from Paris